François Arthur Marcotte (September 25, 1866 – January 16, 1931) was a physician and political figure in Quebec. He represented Champlain in the House of Commons of Canada from 1896 to 1900 as a Conservative.

He was born in Sainte-Anne-de-la-Pérade, Canada East, the son of François Marcotte and Cécile Hardy, and was educated at the Séminaire de Québec and the Université Laval. Marcotte set up practice at Sainte-Anne-de-la-Pérade. He was mayor of Sainte-Anne-de-la-Pérade and also served as warden for Champlain County. Marcotte's election in 1896 was overturned after an appeal but he won the by-election that followed in 1897. He was defeated when he ran for reelection in 1900 and 1904. In 1899, he married Anna Marie Larue. Marcotte died at the Hôtel-Dieu in Quebec City at the age of 64.

References 

Members of the House of Commons of Canada from Quebec
Conservative Party of Canada (1867–1942) MPs
Mayors of places in Quebec
1866 births
1931 deaths